Katie-George Dunlevy (born 26 November 1981) is an English-born Paralympic cyclist competing in tandem events for Ireland, and formerly a rower competing for Great Britain in the 4+ Mixed LTA class.

Career

Dunlevy won a gold medal at the time trial B event and silver in the road race at the 2016 Summer Paralympics with pilot Eve McCrystal.

A multiple World medalist along with McCrystal. In 2014 Dunlevy and McCrystal won their first World Championship medal, a Silver medal in the road race. In 2015 the pair won Bronze in the 3k pursuit at the UCI Para-Cycling Track World Championships in Apeldorm, Netherlands. She became double World Champion at the UCI Para-cycling Road World Championships in September 2017 in Pietermaritzburg, South Africa. A year later in 2018 in Maniago, Italy she retained both titles becoming double World Champion again with McCrystal. In the same year she won Bronze in the 3k pursuit at the UCI Para-Cycling Track World Championships.

In 2019 she won Gold in the time trial at the UCI Para-Cycling Road World Championships in Emmen, Netherlands becoming world champion for the third time and won Silver in the road race. Dunlevy won the B Women's (Tandem) event in the 108 km road race at the Yorkshire 2019 Para-Cycling International with pilot Eve McCrystal in a time of 02:36:57.

In January 2020 Dunlevy and McCrystal won Silver at the UCI Para-Cycling track World Championships in the 3k pursuit.

After 17 months without competition, in June 2021 at the UCI Para-Cycling Road World Championships in Estoril, Portugal, Dunlevy and McCrystal won double Silver in the time trial and road race.

In 2021 the pair won a silver medal at the delayed 2020 Summer Paralympics in the individual pursuit event. 
On the road events a couple of days later they retained their title from Rio in the time trial winning Gold and also won Gold in the road race becoming the most successful Irish female Paralympian.

Personal life
Dunlevy was diagnosed with retinitis pigmentosa (RP) aged 11 and is registered blind. She previously competed in athletics, rowing and swimming before taking up cycling in 2011. She competes for Ireland as her father is a native of Mountcharles, County Donegal. 
She has five sisters.

Dunlevy is openly LGBT.

References

1981 births
Living people
Sportspeople from Crawley
Cyclists at the 2016 Summer Paralympics
Medalists at the 2016 Summer Paralympics
Cyclists at the 2020 Summer Paralympics
Medalists at the 2020 Summer Paralympics
Paralympic gold medalists for Ireland
Paralympic silver medalists for Ireland
Paralympic cyclists of Ireland
Irish female cyclists
World Rowing Championships medalists for Great Britain
Paralympic medalists in cycling
British LGBT sportspeople